Alchemy Records is the name of three different record labels: 

 Alchemy Records (U.S.), based in San Francisco
 Alchemy Records (Japan), based in Osaka
 Alchemy Records (UK), based in London